This is a list of awards and nominations that was received by actor J. K. Simmons. His performance as Terrence Fletcher in Whiplash (2014) received widespread critical acclaim and earned him 40 accolades, including the Academy Award, the Golden Globe Award, and the BAFTA Award for Best Supporting Actor. In 2022, his performance as William Frawley in Being the Ricardos (2021) earned him his second nomination for the Academy Award for Best Supporting Actor and the Critics' Choice Movie Award for Best Supporting Actor.

Major associations

Academy Awards

BAFTA Awards

Golden Globe Awards

Screen Actors Guild Awards

Industry awards

Australian Academy Film Awards

Alliance of Women Film Journalists

Critics' Choice Movie Awards

Drama Desk Awards

Independent Spirit Awards

MTV Movie Awards

Festival awards

Palm Springs International Film Festival

Santa Barbara International Film Festival

Miscellaneous awards

Satellite Awards

Saturn Awards

Village Voice

Critics associations

Online awards 
Gold Derby Awards

References

External links
 

Simmons, J. K.